Westpark is an U-Bahn station in Munich on the U6.

References

Munich U-Bahn stations
Railway stations in Germany opened in 1983
Buildings and structures completed in 1983
1983 establishments in West Germany